Gareth Ormshaw (born 8 July 1979 in South Africa) is a South African retired footballer.

Career
After failing to make an appearance for English Premier League side Crystal Palace, Ormshaw played for Ajax Cape Town, Hellenic, Silver Stars and Lamontville Golden Arrows in the South African top flight.

References

External links
 Gareth Ormshaw at Soccer Base
 

Living people
1979 births
South African soccer players
Association football goalkeepers
South African Premier Division players
Sportspeople from Durban